Bambú may refer to:

 Bambú (Madrid Metro), a station on Line 1
 Bamboo (1945 film) (original title: Bambú), a Spanish historical comedy film
 "Bambú", a song by Miguel Bosé from Los chicos no lloran, 1990
 "Bambú, Bambú", a 1939 song recorded by Carmen Miranda for the film Down Argentine Way

See also 
 Bamboo (disambiguation)
 Bambu (disambiguation)